Bożena is a Polish feminine given name, originally appearing as Bożana and Bożechna. It is  derived from the word "Bóg" (God). 

This Slavic name is equivalent to Božena in Czech,  Slovak and other Slavic languages.

Individuals named Bożena may celebrate their name day on 13 March, 20 June or 27 July (in Slovakia).

Notable people with this name include:
Bożenna Bukiewicz - Polish politician
Bożena Dykiel - Polish actress
Bozenna Intrator - Polish-American writer, lyricist and translator

See also 
 Polish name
 Slavic names

Slavic feminine given names
Polish feminine given names